

Incumbents 

 Monarch: Elizabeth II (until September 8), then Charles III
 Governor-General: Rodney Williams
 Prime Minister: Gaston Browne

Events 
Ongoing — COVID-19 pandemic in Antigua and Barbuda

 September 8 – Accession of Charles III as King of Antigua and Barbuda following the death of Queen Elizabeth II.
 September 10 – Charles III is officially proclaimed King of Antigua and Barbuda at Government's House in St. John's.
 September 11 – Prime Minister Gaston Browne announces his intention to hold a referendum on transitioning the country into a republic.
 September 19 – A national holiday is observed on the day of the funeral of Elizabeth II, Queen of Antigua and Barbuda. The governor-general and the prime minister attend the queen's state funeral in the United Kingdom.
 September 19 – A service of Thanksgiving for Queen Elizabeth II is held at the Cathedral of St John The Divine.

Deaths 

 September 8 – Elizabeth II, Queen of Antigua and Barbuda (born 1926)

References 

 
2020s in Antigua and Barbuda
Years of the 21st century in Antigua and Barbuda
Antigua and Barbuda
Antigua and Barbuda